Thammarak Isarangkura na Ayudhaya is a former Thai military officer, member of parliament, co-founder of the Thai Rak Thai Party, and former defence minister. He was forced into hiding in the 2006 Thailand coup.

Thammarak is of Chinese descent.

Early life and education
Thammarak born on July 22, 1938 in Roi Et Province, is married to  Wanida Isarangkun Na Ayuthaya. He graduated from Prachawittaya School and Buri Ram boarding school, Secondary school from Suankularb Wittayalai School, and Amnuay Silpa School and then Bachelor of Science from Chulachomklao Royal Military Academy Class 10 and National Defense College, Class 34.

Careers
Thammarak used to serve in the military under the army he used to be a commander in military intelligence then he is the commander of Military Circle in Petchaburi Province. He is the Chief of Staff of the Deputy Chief of Staff and Special Expert of Royal Thai Armed Forces Headquarters.

In addition, he was also Chairman of the Organization for the Transport of Goods and Parcel (ETO).

Political careers
Thammarak was Deputy Prime Minister And the Minister of Defense in the government of Thaksin Shinawatra later, in 2007, political rights were disqualified for 5 years due to being the executive committee of the Thai Rak Thai Party which was dissolved in the 2006 political party dissolution case but Thammarak was sentenced to 3 years and 4 months imprisonment for not guilty on 30 May 2012 for being an official user of the organization or government agencies abusing or abusing their duties in order to cause damage to any person or performing or refraining from performing the duties dishonestly. Later, the case was dismissed because there was no evidence showing that Thammarak had any involvement and the court ordered the case to be removed from the directory.

In the 2019 Thai general election, he was nominated as a political party candidate who would propose to parliament to appoint a prime minister on behalf of the Palang Thai Rak Thai Party.

References

Living people
Thammarak Isarangkura na Ayudhaya
Thammarak Isarangkura na Ayudhaya
Thammarak Isarangkura na Ayudhaya
Thammarak Isarangkura na Ayudhaya
Thammarak Isarangkura na Ayudhaya
Thammarak Isarangkura na Ayudhaya
1938 births
Thammarak Isarangkura na Ayudhaya
Thammarak Isarangkura na Ayudhaya